George Lee "Sparky" Anderson (February 22, 1934 – November 4, 2010) was an American Major League Baseball (MLB) player, coach, and manager. He managed the National League's Cincinnati Reds to the 1975 and 1976 championships, then added a third title in 1984 with the Detroit Tigers of the American League. Anderson was the first manager to win the World Series in both leagues. His 2,194 career wins are the sixth-most for a manager in Major League history. He was elected to the Baseball Hall of Fame in 2000.

Early life
Anderson was born in Bridgewater, South Dakota, on February 22, 1934. He moved to Los Angeles, California, at the age of eight. He was a batboy for the USC Trojans. He attended Susan Miller Dorsey High School in Los Angeles.

Anderson's American Legion team won the 1951 national championship, which was played in Briggs Stadium (Tiger Stadium) in Detroit.

Anderson married Carol Valle on October 3, 1953. They had first met when each was in the fifth grade.

Playing career
Anderson began his playing career with the Santa Barbara Dodgers of the Class-C California League, where he was primarily used as a shortstop. In , he was moved up to the class-A Pueblo Dodgers of the Western League and was moved to second base, where he played the rest of his career.

In , Anderson was moved another step up the minor league ladder, playing for the Double-A Fort Worth Cats of the Texas League. A radio announcer gave him the nickname "Sparky" in 1955 for his feisty play. In , he moved up once more, this time to the Triple-A Montreal Royals of the International League. In , he was assigned to the Los Angeles Angels of the open-classification Pacific Coast League. The next season, after the Dodgers' move to Los Angeles, he returned to Montreal.

After five minor league seasons without appearing in a Dodger uniform at the MLB level, he was traded to the Philadelphia Phillies on December 23, 1958, for three players, including outfielder Rip Repulski. The Phillies gave Anderson their starting second base job, and he spent what would be his one full season in the major leagues in 1959. However, he batted only .218 in 152 games, with no home runs and 34 runs batted in, and returned to the minor leagues for the remainder of his playing career.

He played the next four seasons with the Triple-A Toronto Maple Leafs in the International League. After watching several practices, Leafs owner Jack Kent Cooke observed Anderson's leadership qualities and ability to teach younger players from all backgrounds.  Cooke immediately encouraged him to pursue a career in managing, offering Anderson the post for the Leafs.

Managerial career

Minor leagues
In 1964, at the age of 30, Anderson accepted Cooke's offer to manage the Leafs. He later handled minor league clubs at the Class-A and Double-A levels, including a season (1968) in the Reds' minor league system.

During this period, he managed four pennant winners in four consecutive seasons: 1965 with the Rock Hill Cardinals of the Western Carolinas League, 1966 with the St. Petersburg Cardinals of the Florida State League, 1967 with the Modesto Reds of the California League, and 1968 with the Asheville Tourists of the Double-A Southern League. It was during the 1966 season that Anderson's club lost to Miami 4–3 in 29 innings, which remains the longest pro game played (by innings) without interruption.

He made his way back to the majors in 1969 as the third-base coach of the San Diego Padres during their maiden season in the National League.

Cincinnati Reds
Just after the 1969 season ended, California Angels manager Lefty Phillips, who as a Dodger scout had signed the teenager Anderson to his first professional contract, named Anderson to his 1970 coaching staff.

Within days of being hired in Anaheim, he was offered the opportunity to succeed Dave Bristol as manager of the Cincinnati Reds. His appointment reunited Anderson with Reds' general manager Bob Howsam, who had hired him as a minor-league skipper in the St. Louis Cardinals and Cincinnati organizations. Anderson was named the Reds manager on October 8, 1969. Since he was a relative unknown in the sports world, headlines on the day after his hiring read "Sparky Who?" At the time of his hiring, Anderson was, at 35, the youngest skipper in baseball. During this season, the Reds came to be widely known as the Big Red Machine, a nickname they carried throughout Anderson's tenure.

 After an injury-plagued 1971 season in which the team finished fourth, the Reds came back and won another pennant under Anderson in 1972, beating the Pittsburgh Pirates in five games in the NLCS, but losing to the Oakland Athletics in seven games in the World Series.

They swept the National League Championship Series and then edged the Boston Red Sox in a drama-filled, seven-game World Series. Over the course of these two seasons, Anderson's Reds compiled an astounding 14–3 record in postseason play against the Pirates, Phillies, Red Sox and Yankees, winning their last eight in a row in the postseason after beating the Red Sox in Game 7 of the 1975 World Series, and then winning seven straight games in the 1976 postseason. They remain the only team to sweep the entire post-season since the inception of the league championship series in 1969.

During this time, Anderson became known as "Captain Hook" for his penchant for taking out a starting pitcher at the first sign of weakness and going to his bullpen, relying heavily on closers Will McEnaney and Rawly Eastwick.

When the aging Reds finished second to the Dodgers in each of the next two seasons, Anderson was fired on November 27, 1978 by general manager Dick Wagner, who had taken over for Howsam a year earlier. Wagner wanted to "shake up" the Reds' coaching staff, to which Anderson objected, leading to his dismissal.

Detroit Tigers
Anderson moved on to the young Detroit Tigers after being hired as their new manager on June 14, . Upon seeing the team's young talent, he boldly proclaimed to the press that his team would be a pennant winner within five years. The Tigers became a winning club almost immediately, finishing above .500 in each of Anderson's first three full seasons, but did not get into contention until , when they won 92 games and finished second to the Baltimore Orioles in the American League East.

In , Detroit opened the season 9–0, was 35–5 after 40 games (a major league record), and breezed to a 104–58 record (a franchise record for wins). On September 23, Anderson became the first manager to win 100 games in a season with two different teams. They swept the Kansas City Royals in the American League Championship Series (ALCS) and then beat the San Diego Padres in five games in the World Series for Anderson's third world title. The 1984 Tigers became the first team since the 1927 New York Yankees to lead a league wire-to-wire, from opening day to the end of the World Series. After the season, Anderson won the first of his two Manager of the Year Awards with the Tigers.

After the Tigers clinched the AL East division title in 1984, Anderson wrote in his journal: "I have to be honest. I’ve waited for this day since they fired me in Cincinnati. I think they made a big mistake when they did that. Now no one will ever question me again."

Anderson's Tigers finished in third place in both 1985 and 1986. With a 9–5 win over the Milwaukee Brewers on July 29, 1986, Anderson became the first to achieve 600 career wins as a manager in both the American and National Leagues.

Anderson led the Tigers to the Major Leagues' best record in 1987, but the team was upset in the ALCS by the Minnesota Twins. He won his second Manager of the Year Award that year. After contending again in 1988 (finishing second to Boston by one game in the AL East), the team collapsed a year later, losing a startling 103 games. During that 1989 season, Anderson took a month-long leave of absence from the team as the stress of losing wore on him. First base coach Dick Tracewski managed the team in the interim.

In 1991, the Tigers finished last in batting average, first in batting strikeouts and near the bottom of the league in most pitching categories, but still led their division in late August before settling for a second-place finish behind the rival Toronto Blue Jays.

On September 27, 1992, the Tigers beat the Cleveland Indians 13–3 for Anderson's 1,132nd win with the team, passing Hughie Jennings as the all-time leader in wins by a Tiger manager. Anderson continues to hold this distinction with 1,331 victories with the Tigers. On April 15, 1993, he won his 2,000th game as manager with a 3–2 victory over the Oakland Athletics, becoming the seventh manager to do so.

During his managerial career, Anderson was known to heap lavish praise on his ballplayers when talking to the media. He declared Kirk Gibson "the next Mickey Mantle," which he later acknowledged may have put too much pressure on Gibson early in his career. He said Mike Laga, who played for him in 1984, would "make us forget every power hitter who ever lived." He also said Johnny Bench (who played for him in Cincinnati) "will never throw a baseball as hard as Mike Heath" (a catcher who played for him in Detroit).

Anderson is the last American League manager to date to win a game by forfeit. This came a month after being hired in Detroit when, as a result of Disco Demolition Night in Chicago, the second half of a doubleheader with the Chicago White Sox had to be called off after an anti-disco demonstration went awry and severely damaged the playing surface at Comiskey Park. Even after White Sox groundskeepers removed debris from the field, Anderson refused to let the Tigers take the field. He was not only concerned for the safety of his players, but believed the field was unplayable. When American League officials initially made plans to postpone the game until the next afternoon, Anderson demanded that the game be forfeited to the Tigers. He argued that the White Sox, as the home team, were obligated to provide acceptable playing conditions. The next day, American League President Lee MacPhail largely upheld Anderson's argument and forfeited the second game to the Tigers, 9–0.

Managerial record

Retirement

Anderson retired from managing on October 2, 1995, reportedly disillusioned with the state of the league following the 1994 strike that had also delayed the start of the 1995 season. It is widely believed that Anderson was pushed into retirement by the Tigers, who were unhappy that Anderson refused to manage replacement players during spring training in 1995. In an interview on Detroit's WJR radio after his retirement, Anderson said he had told his wife that season, "If this is what the game has become, it don't need me no more."

He finished with a lifetime record of 2,194–1,834, for a .545 percentage and the third-most wins for a Major League manager at the time (behind only Connie Mack and John McGraw).  His win total has since been surpassed by Tony La Russa, Bobby Cox, and Joe Torre, placing him sixth on the all-time list. Anderson spent the largest portion of his career managing the Tigers (1970–78 with the Reds, 1979–95 with the Tigers), winning the World Series twice with Cincinnati and once with Detroit.

Post-managerial work
Both during his tenure with the Tigers, and for a time thereafter, Anderson did some television work as a baseball commentator. From 1979 to 1986 (with the exception of 1984), Anderson was often paired with Vin Scully and later Jack Buck on CBS Radio's coverage of the World Series. From 1996 to 1998, he was a color analyst for the Anaheim Angels' cable television broadcasts.

While still in Detroit, Anderson founded the charitable organization CATCH (Caring Athletes Teamed for Children's and Henry Ford hospitals) in 1987, which helps provide care for seriously ill children whose parents do not have health insurance or the means to otherwise pay for the care. He continued to support and participate in the charity well into his retirement. When interviewed in 2008, Anderson said that CATCH was "the single best thing I ever did in Detroit."

Honors

Anderson was elected to the Baseball Hall of Fame as a manager in 2000. Although he managed 17 seasons in Detroit and just 9 seasons in Cincinnati, his Hall of Fame plaque has him wearing a Cincinnati Reds uniform. He chose to wear the Reds cap at his induction in honor of former GM Bob Howsam, who gave Anderson his first chance at a major-league managing job. Before his induction, Anderson had refused to go inside the Hall because he felt unworthy, saying "I didn't ever want to go into the most precious place in the world unless I belonged." In his acceptance speech he gave a lot of credit to his players, saying there were two kinds of managers, "One, it ain't very smart. He gets bad players, loses games and gets fired. There was somebody like me that was a genius. I got good players, stayed out of the way, let 'em win a lot, and then just hung around for 26 years." He was very proud of his Hall induction, "I never wore a World Series ring ... I will wear this ring until I die."

Anderson was also inducted into the Cincinnati Reds Hall of Fame the same year. On May 28, 2005, during pre-game ceremonies in Cincinnati, Anderson's jersey number, #10, was retired by the Reds. A day in Anderson's honor was also held at Detroit's Comerica Park during the 2000 season.

On June 17, 2006, Anderson's number was retired by the Fort Worth Cats, for whom Anderson had played in 1955. In 2007, Anderson was elected to the Canadian Baseball Hall of Fame.

Throughout the 2011 season, the Tigers honored Anderson with a patch on their right sleeves. They officially retired his No. 11 on the brick wall at Comerica Park on June 26, 2011.

Death and legacy
Anderson was the first manager to win a World Series for both a National League and American League team. Either manager in the 1984 Series would have been the first to win in both leagues, since San Diego Padres (NL) manager Dick Williams had won the series with the Oakland Athletics (AL) in 1972 and 1973. Williams' 1972 club had defeated Anderson's Reds club.

Anderson's accomplishment was equaled in the 2006 World Series, when St. Louis Cardinals manager Tony La Russawho had previously won the World Series with the Oakland Athletics in 1989, and who considers Anderson his mentorled his team to the title over the Detroit Tigers. Coincidentally, having won a championship while managing the Florida Marlins in 1997, Tigers manager Jim Leyland could have achieved this same feat had the Tigers defeated La Russa's Cardinals in the 2006 World Series. During that series, Anderson threw out the ceremonial first pitch of Game 2 at Comerica Park, the Tigers' home park.

Anderson was famous for always stepping over the foul line, never on it when entering or leaving the field. Many times, the camera zoomed in closely to watch him purposely evade the white chalk line.

In 2006, construction was completed on the "Sparky Anderson Baseball Field" at California Lutheran University's new athletic complex. Anderson had used his influence to attract notable players to the university baseball team, and he was also awarded the Laundry Medal by the university for being "an inspiration to youth."

On November 3, 2010, it was announced that Anderson had been placed in hospice care at his Thousand Oaks home because of his deteriorating dementia condition. Anderson died the next day at the age 76 in Thousand Oaks. He was survived by his wife of 57 years, Carol, sons Lee and Albert, daughter Shirlee Engelbrecht, and eight grandchildren. Carol died at age 79 on May 7, 2013, at home in Thousand Oaks.

On June 26, 2011, the Detroit Tigers honored Anderson by retiring his number 11 from future use and placing his name and number on the outfield wall with the other past honorees and members of the Baseball Hall of Fame. Tiger players also wore commemorative patches on their uniform sleeves all season.

Media appearances
 In 1979, Anderson guest-starred as himself on an episode of WKRP in Cincinnati. The episode (titled "Sparky"), features Anderson as a talk-show host on the fictional station. Eventually Anderson is let go, prompting him to say, "I must be crazy. Every time I come to this city, I get fired!"
 Anderson appeared as himself in The White Shadow season 3 episode "If Your Number's Up, Get it Down" in 1980. Falahey introduces him to Coolidge, but Coolidge replies with "Sorry you lost, but I voted for you." Coolidge mistakenly thought he was 1980 independent presidential candidate John Anderson.
 Anderson appeared as himself in the 1983 Disney Channel movie Tiger Town.

See also

 List of Major League Baseball managers by wins
 Bless You Boys: Diary of the Detroit Tigers' 1984 Season

References

External links
 

Sparky Anderson at SABR (Baseball BioProject)
Sparky Anderson at Baseball Almanac

1934 births
2010 deaths
American expatriate baseball players in Canada
Anaheim Angels announcers
Asheville Tourists managers
Baseball coaches from California
Baseball coaches from South Dakota
Baseball players from South Dakota
Canadian Baseball Hall of Fame inductees
Cincinnati Reds managers
Deaths from dementia in California
Detroit Tigers managers
Fort Worth Cats players
Major League Baseball broadcasters
Major League Baseball second basemen
Major League Baseball third base coaches
Major League Baseball managers with retired numbers
Manager of the Year Award winners
Montreal Royals players
National Baseball Hall of Fame inductees
People from McCook County, South Dakota
People with Parkinson's disease
Philadelphia Phillies players
Pueblo Dodgers players
San Diego Padres coaches
Santa Barbara Dodgers players
Toronto Maple Leafs (International League) players
Toronto Maple Leafs (International League) managers
World Series-winning managers
Susan Miller Dorsey High School alumni
Rock Hill Cardinals players